Cyril Leslie Hodges (18 September 1919 – September 1979) was an English professional footballer who played as a forward in the Football League.

Career
Hodges was born in Hackney, London, in 1919. After playing with Eton Manor, Hodges joined Arsenal in 1944 and turned professional in April 1945. He made two appearances for them in the Football League, before joining Brighton & Hove Albion, where he made a further nine League appearances. After a spell as a player-coach with Haywards Heath, Hodges spent eleven years as trainer and then coach at Brighton & Hove Albion. He remained living in Brighton, and died in the town in September 1979.

References

1919 births
1979 deaths
People from the London Borough of Hackney
English footballers
Association football forwards
Eton Manor F.C. players
Arsenal F.C. players
Brighton & Hove Albion F.C. players
Haywards Heath Town F.C. players
English Football League players